Chuksha is a rural locality (a village) in Voskresenskoye Rural Settlement, Cherepovetsky District, Vologda Oblast, Russia. The population was 10 as of 2002.

Geography 
Staroye Zakharovo is the nearest rural locality.

References 

Rural localities in Cherepovetsky District